The Battle of Lake Providence was fought on June 9, 1863, during the Vicksburg campaign of the American Civil War.  Confederate troops from the Trans-Mississippi Department were trying to relieve Union pressure during the Siege of Vicksburg.  Major General Richard Taylor, primarily utilizing Walker's Greyhounds, prepared a three-pronged attack against Union positions at Milliken's Bend, Young's Point, and Lake Providence.  The strike against Lake Providence was conducted by 900 men led by Colonel Frank Bartlett.

Bartlett's force crossed Bayou Macon two days late.  The Confederates encountered a Union picket force  from their destination.  The Union pickets withdrew, alerted Union commander Brigadier General Hugh T. Reid, and while withdrawing burned the bridge over Bayou Tensas.  The Confederate were forced to halt at Bayou Tensas by the wrecked bridge, and before the structure could be rebuilt, Reid arrived with his main force. A Confederate cannon was driven off by Union fire, and Bartlett withdrew his men at dusk.  The attack against Lake Providence accomplished little, the strike against Milliken's Bend was defeated in the Battle of Milliken's Bend, and little came of the movement against Young's Point.  Vicksburg surrendered on July 4.

Background

In early 1863, during the American Civil War, Major General Ulysses S. Grant of the Union Army began a campaign against Vicksburg, Mississippi, which was held by Confederate troops.  In late April, the Union troops crossed the Mississippi River from Louisiana to Mississippi, south of Vicksburg.  By May 18, Grant's troops had surrounded Vicksburg and placed the city under siege.  During the early part of the campaign, Grant had operated a supply depot at Milliken's Bend in Louisiana, but by the time of the siege, Grant had established a different supply line, decreasing the importance of Milliken's Bend.  Grant still kept minor supply points at Milliken's Bend, Young's Point, and Lake Providence in Louisiana; the sites were also used to train newly-recruited United States Colored Troops (USCT).  The USCT troops were not intended to be used as front-line combat soldiers, so they had only received rudimentary military training.  The positions were also garrisoned by white troops.

Jefferson Davis, the Confederate president, pressured E. Kirby Smith, the commander of the Trans-Mississippi Department, to undertake an offensive in Louisiana to take some of the pressure off of Vicksburg.  The Confederate did not know at this time that events had rendered Milliken's Bend of lower importance to Grant.  The Confederate Trans-Mississippi effort to help Vicksburg would be conducted by Major General Richard Taylor, using an infantry division from Texas known as Walker's Greyhounds.  Taylor preferred a strike against New Orleans, Louisiana, and conducted the campaign with subdued enthusiasm.  Confederate cavalry occupied Richmond, Louisiana, on June 3, Major General John George Walker's troops reached Richmond on June 6, and Taylor planned a three-pronged strike for the next day: Confederate troops were to attack Milliken's Bend, Young's Point, and Lake Providence.

Battle
The strike at Lake Providence was commanded by Colonel Frank Bartlett, who was responsible for Confederate forces operating in the Lake Providence area, and consisted of the 13th Louisiana Cavalry Battalion and the 13th Texas Cavalry Regiment, a force totaling about 900 men.  Bartlett had orders to destroy the Union camp at Lake Providence and then destroy the Union-run plantations between that point and Milliken's Bend.  The Confederate forced gathered at Floyd, Louisiana, where a bridge across Bayou Macon was constructed.  However, Bartlett decided to cross the bayou elsewhere, instead moving his troops to Caledonia.  The Confederate finally crossed Bayou Macon on June 9, two days late.

After crossing the bayou, Bartlett struck a Union outpost at Bunch's Bend on the Mississippi River, and then continued along the shore of an oxbow lake also known as Lake Providence.  Only 600 Confederates were present for this stage of the advance.  When the Confederates reached Bayou Baxter,  from their objective, they made contact a picket force consisting of two companies from the 1st Kansas Mounted Infantry Regiment.  Outnumbered, the Kansans withdrew and a messenger informed Brigadier General Hugh T. Reid, the Union commander at Lake Providence, of the Confederate advance.  The withdrawal crossed Bayou Tensas, where the Union forces burned the bridge over the bayou.  During this stage of the action, the Confederates captured 9 supply wagons and 36 mules.

Having learned of the Confederate advance, Reid brought up his full 800-man force.  Bayou Tensas was only  from the town.  The Confederates reached the wrecked bridge over Bayou Tensas before Reid's main force did, and after sending out skirmishers and deploying a 6-pounder field gun, had military pioneers attempt to rebuild the bridge.  Before this could by completed, Reid's force arrived.  The Union commander deployed men from the 1st Kansas and the 16th Wisconsin Infantry Regiments, and Union sharpshooters were sent forward. Union fire forced the Confederate cannon to withdraw after the piece fired five shots.

The two sides continued to shoot at each other for another hour and a half with little effect.  At dusk, Bartlett withdrew most of the Confederate force, leaving behind only a group of skirmishers.  Reid withdrew his previously-engaged men and deployed the 8th Louisiana Infantry Regiment (African Descent), a USCT unit.  The Union unit fired several volleys into the Confederates, who withdrew.  Bartlett believed that Reid had more men than he actually had, and did not attempt to cross Bayou Tensas at any points downstream from the Union position, although historian John D. Winters believes such a movement would have been feasible.

Aftermath
One Union soldier was wounded during the fight, while the Confederates lost two men killed and five wounded.  By June 10, Bartlett's men were back at Floyd; the only thing they had accomplished during the affair was the destruction of a cotton gin.  The attack on Milliken's Bend had been defeated in the Battle of Milliken's Bend on June 7, and little came of the strike against Young's Point.  Winters blames Taylor for the failure of the Confederate offensive, suggesting that he should instead have concentrated his troops.  While Taylor broke off his campaign, Walker's men remained in the area.  Walker withdrew from Richmond after his men were attacked on June 15.  Confederate troops captured a small Union camp in the area in the Battle of Goodrich's Landing on June 29, but were driven off the next day.  Vicksburg surrendered on July 4; the fall of the city represented a major Confederate defeat.

References

Sources
  Note: ISBN printed in book is 0-89029-516-3.
 
 

 
 
 
 

Lake Providence
Lake Providence
Lake Providence
East Carroll Parish, Louisiana
Lake Providence
1863 in Louisiana
June 1863 events